Lauren Braun Costello (born in New York, NY on October 19, 1976) is a chef, author, and culinary personality.

Lauren's culinary career began in 2002 when she enrolled at The French Culinary Institute (now The International Culinary Center). She launched Gotham Caterers that same year as Executive Chef and owner. She simultaneously ventured into food styling and has styled for some of the biggest names in the culinary world. Her creations have been featured on ABC's The View, The Early Show on CBS, and Fox & Friends. She was the author of a weekly cooking column called "The Competent Cook," on CDKitchen.com, and served as a recipe tester and developer for the 75th Anniversary edition of the Joy of Cooking cookbook.

In 2010, Lauren was tapped to host 45 episodes of a new AOL cooking series called Pantry Challenge. The series became one of the most popular on AOL's cooking channel, KitchenDaily.com, logging more than 5 million views in its first three months. Lauren's recipes and party-planning advice have appeared in The Los Angeles Times and the Chicago Tribune, and she has made numerous television appearances on WNBC's Today in New York.  Lauren also appeared as a guest on ABC's The View with Meryl Streep, Amy Adams, and Nora Ephron to showcase some of Julia Child's favorite recipes for the release of the movie “Julie & Julia.”

Over the past ten years, Lauren's focus has been her family, raising her two sons with her husband in her native New York and Westport, Connecticut. Now, that the boys are older, they have given her their blessing to pick up where she left off and show the world how to have fun in the kitchen as only Lauren can. "Through her "It's Lauren, of Course" segments, viewers love seeing the modern-day Jewish mother, who highlights the culinary techniques needed to make great meals without the anticipated torture. For Lauren, there's a right way to cook, a wrong way to cook, and her way to cook. Her food is fun, it's delicious and 100% authentic. Whether making over-the-top boxed lunches, weeknight dinners for her family, or entertaining for clients, Lauren doesn't miss a beat.

Books 
Lauren is the author of three books. The first, Notes on Cooking: A Short Guide to an Essential Craft (June 2009, RCR Creative Press), was endorsed by Jacques Pépin, Lidia Bastianich, Dan Barber, James Peterson, Michael Romano, Gael Greene, and Chef Daniel Boulud who wrote that Lauren and her co-author Russell Reich "bring you indispensable advice, experience, and know-how of many great chefs." Notes on Cooking received critical acclaim from The New York Times,Washington Post,Food & Wine, Gourmet,Fine Cooking, and Publishers Weekly. The book was a ''ForeWord Magazine "Book of the Year" Silver Award Winner] and a Benjamin Franklin Award Finalist.

In addition to Notes on Cooking,'' Lauren is the author of [https://www.amazon.com/The-Competent-Cook-Essential-Techniques/dp/B004JZWR7Q/ref=sr_1_1?s=books&ie=UTF8&qid=1331614217&sr=1-1/ The Competent Cook: Essential Tools, Techniques, and Recipes for the Modern At-Home Cook (November 2009, Adams Media) and the co-author (with Jackie Jafarian Broad) of Eat Your Breakfast Or Else! (October 2010, Three Puppies Press).

Education 
Lauren holds a B.A. from Colgate University and earned a Grand Diploma in Culinary Arts with distinction from The French Culinary Institute (FCI). While studying at FCI, she was named a recipient of the Les Dames d'Escoffier scholarship in 2003.

References

External links 
 The Huffington Post - The Huffington Post's bio of Lauren Braun Costello
 Reuters - Reuters interview, August 4, 2009
It's Lauren of Course  - Lauren Braun Costello's professional website
 Notes on Cooking  - Notes on Cooking website
 Three Puppies Press  - Eat Your Breakfast Or Else! publisher's website
 KitchenDaily  - The Huffington Post's dedicated cooking destination
 CDKitchen  - CDKitchen website

1976 births
Living people
American chefs